Ziya Gökalp Mahallesi is an underground station on the M9 line of the Istanbul Metro in Başakşehir, Istanbul. The station is located beneath Hürriyet Boulevard in the Ziya Gökalp neighborhood of Başakşehir. Ziya Gökalp Mahallesi was opened on 13 June 2013 as part of the Olimpiyatköy branch to Olimpiyat station. It was converted in to the M9 line along with the Olimpiyat station.

Station Layout

References

External links
Ziya Gökalp Mahallesi station portal in Google Street View

Railway stations opened in 2013
Istanbul metro stations
2013 establishments in Turkey